Gudrun Lund (22 April 1930 – 14 January 2020) was a Danish composer. She was born in Aalborg and studied music, German and English at the Copenhagen Conservatory. After graduating, she took a position teaching at the Copenhagen Day and Evening College of Education (KDAS).

Lund began composing in 1975 at the age of 45. At that time she continued her studies in composition with Svend S. Schultz and Mogens Winkel Holm. In 1983-4 she studied at Hartt College of Music,  University of Hartford in West Hartford, Connecticut, USA.

Works
Lund has composed over a hundred works in several genres. Selected compositions include:
Three Pieces for Horn
Piano Trio op. 67
Five Dialogues
Six Duos Op.40 for trumpet
Clarinet Trio for clarinet, viola and piano
Talks, op. 136 for flute, clarinet and bassoon (I. Learning something  II. Politicians  III. Sad news  IV. Solving problems)

Her music has been recorded and issued on CD, including:
New Danish Woodwind Music Audio CD (July 1, 1997) Paula Records, ASIN: B00000I5BH
10 Tankevaekkende udsagn [10 suggestive ulterances], for female voice, flute, cello and accordion (1994) FA2351-WARM Quartet CD Danacord DACOCD423 (1995)

References

1930 births
2020 deaths
20th-century classical composers
Danish music educators
Women classical composers
Danish classical composers
University of Hartford Hartt School alumni
Women music educators
20th-century women composers
People from Aalborg